Caraceni is an Italian tailoring house, founded in Rome in 1913 by the father of Italian tailoring, Domenico Caraceni. At one point in the 1930s, Domenico and his family operated ateliers in Rome, Milan and Paris. The Paris atelier was operated by Domenico's brother, Augusto, who closed his atelier when Mussolini declared war on France.

Today, there are several businesses going by the name "Caraceni" in operation. The original shop operates out of a small location in Rome with a very small workforce. This is run by Tommy and Giulio Caraceni, nephews of Domenico. There are three branches in Milan, all founded by offshoots of the clan, one even claiming to be the "real Caraceni."  However, the cognoscenti consider A. Caraceni, currently operated by Mario Caraceni (son of Augusto) to be the best of the Milan branches.  These suits are what is known as "bench bespoke," meaning they are made one at a time, by hand, to a pattern specifically drawn for each individual customer.

Gianni Campagna, once an apprentice at Sartoria Domenico Caraceni in Milan, acquired the Sartoria Domenico Caraceni label in 1998. Under this name, his company makes expensive made-to-measure suits out of the Palazzo Bernasconi in Milan. This business is separate from and not affiliated with the other Caraceni bespoke ateliers in Rome and Milan.

Notable clients
The various Caraceni "sartorias" have made suits for various celebrities over the years, including Tyrone Power, Humphrey Bogart, Gary Cooper, Cary Grant, Yves Saint Laurent, Gianni Agnelli, Diego Granese, Sophia Loren and fashion designer Valentino Garavani. The Caraceni label is also famous for dressing generations of The Kings of Greece and Italy, The Prince of Wales, Prince Rainier of Monaco, Italian Prime Minister Silvio Berlusconi and Aristotle Onassis. International fashion designers including Ralph Lauren, Calvin Klein, Gianfranco Ferrè and Karl Lagerfeld frequented the atelier over the years. In the 1950s and 1960s the A. Caraceni brand was the chosen tailor of many in the Italian automotive circle, including Gianni Agnelli and Enzo Ferrari.

See also
 Italian fashion
 Made in Italy

References

Further reading 

Fashion designers from Rome
Clothing brands of Italy
Clothing companies established in 1913
Italian companies established in 1913
Luxury brands
High fashion brands
Italian suit makers
Manufacturing companies based in Rome